Alec Alston (26 February 1937 – 23 February 2009) was an English footballer who played in the Football League for Barrow, Bury and Preston North End. His brother Adrian was also a professional footballer, representing Australia at international level. Both brothers played together for Fleetwood in season 1967-68.

References

External links
 

English footballers
English Football League players
1937 births
2009 deaths
Preston North End F.C. players
Bury F.C. players
Barrow A.F.C. players
Fleetwood Town F.C. players
Kendal Town F.C. players
Footballers from Preston, Lancashire
Association football forwards